Hanil University is a private university located in Wanju, South Korea. Started with the merger of the Neel Bible School, founded in 1922 by nursing missionary, Elisabeth Shepping and the Hamilton Bible School founded in Jeonju a year later by medical missionary, M. Ingold. It is described as "an education institute ratified by the General Assembly of the Presbyterian Church in Korea (Tonghap)" to "foster leaders of the regional societies and churches by nurturing outstanding individuals equipped with religious character and scholarly intelligence."

References

External links

Wanju County
Private universities and colleges in South Korea
Universities and colleges in North Jeolla Province
Educational institutions established in 1923
1923 establishments in Korea